Haim Kadmon  (1897 - 1985) 1920–1948 Senior official in British Mandatory government in Palestine 1948 - 1965 Administrator General and Official Receiver, Ministry of Justice, Government of Israel 1965–1983 Voluntary service in Ort Israel, Youth Hostel association, Magen David Adom

British Mandatory government – 1920 – 1948
Haim Kadmon entered the administration of regulating train traffic, then in the paymasters office of the police. After the legislation of the bankruptcy law he was sent to London to study in order to be appointed to the office of the Official Receiver. In due course he was appointed to be the Deputy Official Receiver. On leaving the Official Receiver's office he served in a senior position in the office of Trade and Industry.

Haim Kadmon was in charge of the administration of the bankruptcy of Gaza's mayor, Fachmi Husseini, who owned large tracts of land in the south of the country. The decision of the court under a British judge ordered the land to be transferred to the Keren Kayemet Leisrael on which lands five settlements were established in due course. Also when he served in the office of the Trade and Industries he contributed to strengthen the Jewish industry specially since Palestine was closed off from the world pending and during the second world war.

Israel government – 1948-1965
With the establishment of the State of Israel on 15 May 1948 Kadmon was immediately appointed as Administrator General and Official Receiver. In this capacity he formulated the functioning of the different departments – which included

 searching for property of absentee owners and administering their property,
 administering the property of those who were unable to do so on their own, (under age, mentally sick etc.) In their name, those who were "graduates" of the holocaust, he submitted claims for compensation to the German government.
 administering bequests and legacies to the State of Israel In this capacity Kadmon took action and convinced the Israeli government to sign treaties with a number of European governments according to which there was mutual exemption of estate taxes for charitable purposes.
administering property of different foreign organizations that were under German ownership (the Germans were expelled from the country as enemies because of the 2nd world war and he "inherited" the administration from the Mandatory Government) as well as the property of the Russian Government.
administering the property of bankrupt persons and companies – in this capacity his policy was to continue, whenever possible, the activity of the company in order to find a potential buyer and thus receive better compensation for the claimants and contribute toward the economic and industrial development. This policy was continued by his successors.

He composed (formulated) the law of "Enemy Property"

Under the law of inheritance the Administrator General was asked whenever potential heirs were sought.

Kadmon initiated the negotiations with the Templars, Lutheran organization, German Catholics and the Russian Government to purchase their property in Israel for the State of Israel. Beside the negotiations with the Templars, he chaired the others. The negotiations were successful and the property was transferred to the State of Israel.

Voluntary service
Upon retiring from Government service Kadmon occupied himself in fields he thought to be important. He was especially interested in investing in the enhancement of education of youth (in the wide sense). He joined the executive committee of Ort Israel (a network of scientific and technological schools and colleges of different levels up to academic degrees), the association of Youth Hostels and Magen David Adom (first aid  institution). He was active in the pedagogic committee of Ort and initiated the Comptrol committee which he chaired.

Biography
Haim Kadmon, born Kosloff, was born in 1897 in a small village in the province of Mogilev near Bialystok in Belarus. He was one of five children. He studied in a Heder (Orthodox) and then attended a public Jewish school. On graduation he intended to continue to a secondary school in Bialistok, but because of numerus clausus requirements he would not have been accepted unless he paid 500.- Rubal. He heard from his Hebrew teacher that in Palestine, in Tel Aviv-Yafo, existed the Herzlia gymnasium to which he applied to be accepted. He began his studies there in 1913. On returning for holiday to his family in Russia in 1914 he was caught up in the Communistic revolution. As he had to continue his studies there he enrolled in a technical school where he studied administration of regulating train traffic (he heard that the British Mandatory Government in Palestine was planning to develop the regulation of train traffic).

In 1919 he married Judith, an eye doctor, and together they decided to emigrate to Palestine arriving on the famous Ruslan ship. Upon arriving he entered service in the British Mandatory Government. While in service and after the bankruptcy legislation was enacted he was sent to London to study where he received his diploma of certified accountant so that he could be appointed to serve in the office of the Official Receiver. In due course he was appointed to be the deputy.

In 1958 Kadmon married his second wife Miriam. Haim Kadmon died in 1985.

References

1897 births
1985 deaths
Israeli government officials
Mandatory Palestine people